The 2007 Copa del Rey Juvenil was the 57th staging of the tournament. The competition began on May 6, 2007 and ended on June 24, 2007 with the final.

First round

|}

Quarterfinals

|}

Semifinals

|}

Final

Copa del Rey Juvenil de Fútbol
Juvenil